Horní Police is a municipality and village in Česká Lípa District in the Liberec Region of the Czech Republic. It has about 700 inhabitants.

Administrative parts
The villages and hamlets of Dvorsko, Na Výšině, Pod Školou, and Podlesí are administrative parts of Horní Police.

Geography

It lies in the Central Bohemian Uplands. The village is situated in a valley along the Ploučnice river.

History
The first written mention of Horní Police is in a document by Pope Gregory X from 15 May 1273, confirming its ownership by the Doksany monastery. During the Hussite Wars, Horní Police was acquired by the Berka of Dubá family. They owned the estate until 1612, when they had to sell it due to debts. It was bought by the Novohradský branch of the Kolowrat family. After 1628, Horní Police was inherited by Anna Magdalena of Lobkowicz and subsequently acquired by Julius Henry of Saxe-Lauenburg, who married her in 1632.

Demographics

Transport
Horní Police is located on a railway line leading from Liberec to Děčín.

Sights

The first written mention of a church in Horní Police is from 1291, but it was destroyed during the Hussite Wars. A new small church became a well-known pilgrimage destination and had to be expanded. The current baroque Church of the Visitation of the Virgin Mary was built by Giulio Broggio on the site of the older church in 1688–1701.

Horní Police Castle was built after 1680 on the site of a former keep by its owner Julius Francis, Duke of Saxe-Lauenburg.

The stone arch bridge which connects the church and the castle is one of the three most valuable buildings in Horní Police. It was built in 1840 and it is the third oldest bridge over the river Ploučnice, and the oldest original one.

Notable people
Julius Vincenz von Krombholz (1782–1843), physician, mycologist and rector of the University of Prague

References

External links

Villages in Česká Lípa District